The 1990–91 Major Soccer League season was the 13th and penultimate in league history and would end with the San Diego Sockers winning their ninth NASL or MISL title in ten indoor seasons and fourth MISL title in a row.

Recap
This was the first offseason in MISL history that did not have any franchise movement or collapse. After the season, however, the Kansas City Comets folded. In a nod to the burgeoning nationwide interest in outdoor soccer after the 1990 World Cup, the league's name was changed on July 24. Also, Commissioner Earl Foreman was selected to chair the United States Soccer Federation's exploratory committee for a first-division outdoor league.

Teams

Regular Season Schedule

The 1990–91 regular season schedule ran from October 19, 1990, to April 7, 1991. The 52 games per team was unchanged from the 1989–90 schedule.

Final standings
Playoff teams in bold.

Playoffs

Division Semifinals

Division Finals

Championship Series

Scoring leaders

GP = Games Played, G = Goals, A = Assists, Pts = Points

All-MISL Teams

League awards
Most Valuable Player: Victor Nogueira, San Diego

Scoring Champion: Tatu, Dallas

Pass Master: Tatu, Dallas

Defender of the Year: Kevin Crow, San Diego

Rookie of the Year: David Banks, San Diego

Newcomer of the Year:  Paul Peschisolido, Kansas City

Goalkeeper of the Year: Victor Nogueira, San Diego

Coach of the Year: Trevor Dawkins, Cleveland

Championship Series Most Valuable Player: Ben Collins, San Diego

Championship Series Unsung Hero: Glenn Carbonara, San Diego

Team Attendance Totals

References

External links
 1990-91 summary at The MISL: A Look Back
 1991 page - Dallas Sidekicks Memorial Archive
 The Year in American Soccer - 1991

Major Indoor Soccer League (1978–1992) seasons
Major
Major